The Trumpchi GE3 is a front-motor, five-door all-electric subcompact crossover SUV planned in 2017 to be manufactured by GAC Group and is based on Trumpchi's GS3.

Description 
The GE3 is powered by an electric motor with 177 hp with a top speed of 156 km/h and a range around 300 kilometers. Price of the Trumpchi GE3 ranges from 212,800 to 245,800 yuan.

For the GE3 530 model, the manufacturer claims are 54.75 kWh of battery capacity and 410 km of NEDC range.

GAC-Mitsubishi Eupheme EV and E-More concept

During the 2018 Beijing Auto Show, GAC-Mitsubishi launched the Guangzhou Auto E-More concept previewing an upcoming electric crossover. Despite Guangzhou Auto claiming that it was designed from the ground up as an EV, instead of being based on an existing petrol powered car, the Mitsubishi E-More was clearly based on the Trumpchi GS3. The production version of the Mitsubishi E-More will be launched in October.

The production version of the E-More concept was launched during the 2019 Shanghai Auto Show as the GAC-Mitsubishi Eupheme EV (祺智 EV). The Eupheme EV is equipped with a 180 horsepower(132 kW) and 290 N·m electric motor and a 54.75kWh battery capable of a 410 km electric range. The top speed of the Eupheme EV is 156 km/h.

See also 
Government incentives for plug-in electric vehicles
 List of GAC vehicles
List of modern production plug-in electric vehicles
List of production battery electric vehicles
Plug-in electric vehicle

References

External links 
 
 (Global)

2010s cars
Electric concept cars
Cars introduced in 2017
Cars of China
Crossover sport utility vehicles
Mini sport utility vehicles
GE3
Production electric cars